Reloaded is the second studio album by American hip hop recording artist Roc Marciano, released on November 13, 2012, by Decon. Marciano produced most of the album and was assisted by The Alchemist, Ray West, Q-Tip, and The Arch Druids. The album features guest contributions by rappers KA and Knowledge the Pirate.

Critical reception

At Metacritic, which assigns a normalized rating out of 100 to reviews from mainstream critics, the album received an average score of 83, which indicates "universal acclaim", based on 13 reviews. Nick de Molina of XXL praised its production as "bold and experimental", and called Reloaded "a thrilling upgrade of signature East Coast delivery in the new age and one of the best albums of the year to date." Phillip Mlynar of Spin felt that "Marciano's writing style elevates [the album] to a great one" and stated, "he's written perhaps the most vivid rap album of the year — and possibly of his lifetime." Peter Marrack of Exclaim! called it "a sequel nonpareil in its originality and craftsmanship ... a humbling exhibit of spoken poetry knitted to orchestral magic, mixed and beautified by Q-Tip himself." Although he found it thematically "narrow", Pitchfork Media's Ian Cohen found Marciano's "lyrical genius ... so captivating on a second-by-second basis that these criticisms feel misplaced or even irrelevant", and stated, "Reloaded improves on Marcberg in every conceivable way."

About.com ranked the album #4 on its list of the "Top 10 Rap Albums of 2012." Spin ranked the album #6 on its list of the "40 Best Hip-Hop Albums of 2012."

Track listing

Charts

References

2012 albums
Roc Marciano albums
Albums produced by Roc Marciano
Albums produced by Q-Tip (musician)
Albums produced by the Alchemist (musician)
Decon albums